The BYD Song Max is a compact multi purpose vehicle (MPV) developed by BYD.

Overview 

BYD released previewed images of the BYD Song Max in April 2017. In September 2017, the BYD Song Max was launched in China.

Powertrain
Only one engine was offered at launch.

BYD Song Max DM (Dual-mode) and Song EV

Just like the F3DM compact car, the F6DM prototype, and the Song Pro, BYD launched the Song Max DM PHEV and Song Max EV in April 2019 during the 2019 Shanghai Auto Show. 

The Song Max DM and Song Max EV is nearly identical to the regular Song Max apart from the front grilles and badging.

2021 facelift
The Song Max received a facelift in August 2020 for the 2021 model year. The facelift includes a minor restyle for the front bumper and a redesigned rear end. The interior update features a 12.8 inch screen in the center console and 6-seater 2+2+2 configurations and 7-seater 2+3+2 configurations. The transmission is a 6-speed DCT gearbox.

BYD Song Max DM-i
The BYD Song Max DM-i is the updated version of the previous Song Max DM for the 2022 model year. The Song Max DM-i is equipped with the DM-i plug-in hybrid system consisting of a 1.5-litre engine plus electric motor, with extended roof models added. The 2022 Song MAX DM-i has 6-seater and 7-seater models to choose from, among which the extended roof models are all 6-seater. With the extended roof, the 2022 Song MAX DM-i is as high as 1880mm adding the extra height to the interior space. The 1.5-litre engine from the DM-i setup is code-named BYD472QA and produces a maximum power of 81kW, and the permanent magnet synchronous electric motor model is TZ220XYE, powered by lithium iron phosphate batteries. The combined power of the BYD Song Max DM-i reaches 145kW, and the comprehensive fuel consumption of the Ministry of Industry and Information Technology is 0.9L/100km.

References

External links 
 Official website (in Chinese)

BYD vehicles
Minivans
Front-wheel-drive vehicles
Cars of China
Cars introduced in 2017
Production electric cars